married surname Reed (born 17 July 1974 in Karl-Marx-Stadt) is a triathlete from the Czech Republic.

Zelenková competed at the second Olympic triathlon at the 2004 Summer Olympics. She did not finish the competition. She won Ironman 70.3 South Africa and Ironman South Africa in 2009. She resides in South Africa and coaches pro, elite and age group athletes.

References

External links

1974 births
Living people
Czech female triathletes
Triathletes at the 2004 Summer Olympics
Olympic triathletes of the Czech Republic
Sportspeople from Chemnitz